The Jämtland Ranger Corps (JFK), is a Swedish Army infantry unit that operated in various forms the years 1670–1983, 1990–1997, 2000–2005 and 2021–present. The unit was located in Östersund Garrison in Östersund.

History 
The regiment had its origin in Ångermanlands, Medelpads och Jämtlands regemente raised in 1646 in the newly conquered province Jämtland, although the men were mostly recruited in the old Swedish provinces of Ångermanland and Medelpad. The regiment was also called Thomas Gärffelts regemente after its first commander.

The regiment was disbanded in 1661 as the recruitment provinces were transferred to the navy. But some companies of the regiment did exist until 1670, when they were incorporated in the newly raised Jämtlands regemente till fot (or Anders Plantings regemente). From 1689 on, the regiment was named Jämtlands dragonregemente, but had only one company of cavalry troops. This company was later organized into Norrland Dragoon Regiment.

The regiment was renamed Jämtlands infanteriregemente in 1770 before gaining the present name in 1820. The regiment also had the name Jämtlands fältjägarkår a short period between 1853 and 1892. Jämtlands fältjägarregemente was garrisoned in Östersund and was given the designation I 23 (23rd Infantry Regiment) after a general order in 1816. This was changed to I 5 in 1927. For a short time in the 1990s, the regiment was merged with the mobilization unit Fältjägarbrigaden before being reorganized in 2000 back to a separate existence as Jämtlands fältjägarregemente. The regiment ceased training conscripts in 2004, and was completely disbanded by August 2006.

Campaigns 
 The Thirty Years' War 1647–1649
 The Northern Wars 1655–1658
 The Scanian War 1675–1679(?)
 The Great Northern War 1700–1721
 The Gustav III's Russian War 1788–1790
 The Finnish War 1808–1809
 The Campaign against Norway 1814

Organization 
1689(?)

 Livkompaniet
 Överstelöjtnantens kompani
 Majorens kompani
 Brunflo kompani
 Hallens kompani
 Revsunds kompani
 Ovikens kompani
 Bergs kompani

1853

 Livkompaniet
 Bergs kompani
 Revsunds kompani
 Hammerdals kompani

Barracks and training areas

Barracks
Between 21 December 1687 and 15 August 1926, the regiment was trained at Frösö military camp. On 7 October 1905, the regiment's schools were moved to the Gamla skolan ("Old School") (Västra skolan, "Western School") at Rådhusgatan 44. In the autumn of 1910, the regiment moved into a newly established barracks at Fältjägargränd 13. The barracks were drawn by Erik Josephson, and was built after the 1901 military order's building program after Fortifikationens design for infantry barracks. On 8 April 1911, the regiment commemorated the moving to Östersund through a moving ceremony. After the regiment was disbanded and commenced its decommissioning, the barracks area was left on 31 August 2006.

Training areas
From 1687 to 1926, the regiment was based and trained at Frösö military camp. The regiment later trained at Grytans training area. The administration of the training area was under Norrland Artillery Regiment (A 4). After Norrland Artillery Regiment was disbanded in 1997, Jämtland Ranger Regiment took over the responsibility of the administration.

Heraldry and traditions

Colours, standards and guidons
The Jämtland Ranger Regiment (I 5) presents one regimental colour and two battalion colours:

Colour of the Jämtland Ranger Regiment
The I 5 colour was drawn by Kristina Holmgård-Åkerberg and embroidered by machine in insertion technique by the company Libraria. The colour was presented to the regiment at the regimental barracks in Östersund by His Majesty the King Carl XVI Gustaf on 24 August 1996. Blazon: "On blue cloth the provincial badge of Jämtland; a white elk passant, attacked on its back by a rising falcon and in the front by a rampant dog, both yellow; all animals armed red. On a white border at the upper side of the colour, battle honours in blue." Battle honours: Nowodwor (1655).

Colour of the Ranger Battalion
The battalion colour of the Ranger Battalion (Fältjägarbataljonen) was drawn by Kristina Holmgård-Åkerberg and embroidered by machine in insertion technique by Maj-Britt Salander/company Blå Kusten. The colour was presented to the Jämtland Ranger Brigade (Fältjägarbrigaden, NB 5) at the regimental barracks in Östersund by His Majesty the King Carl XVI Gustaf on 24 August 1996. It was used by NB 5 until 1 July 2000. Blazon: "On blue cloth the provincial badge of Jämtland; a white elk passant, attacked on its back by a rising falcon and in the front by a rampant dog, both yellow; all animals armed red. On a white border at the upper side of the colour, battle honours and close to the staff a flying eagle, all blue."

Colour of the Norrland Logistic Battalion
The colour of the Norrland Logistic Battalion (Trängbat/I 5), was drawn by Ingrid Lamby and embroidered by machine in insertion technique by the Engelbrektsson Flag factory. The colour was presented to the then Norrland Logistic Corps (T 3) at the Artillery Yard in Stockholm by the Chief of Army Staff, Lieutenant General Åke Sagrén on 21 October 1995. It was used as regimental colour by T 3 until 1 June 2000. Blazon: "On light blue cloth in the middle, on a circular shield, the lesser coat of arms of Sweden according to the law, the shield surrounded by white tongues and rays. In the first corner the reindeer of the provincial badge of Västerbotten; white with red arms."

Coat of arms
The coat of the arms of the Jämtland Ranger Regiment (I 5/Fo 22) 1977–1994, the Jämtland Ranger Brigade (Fältjägarbrigaden, NB 5) 1994–2000 and the Jämtland Ranger Regiment (I 5) 2000–2004. Blazon: "Azure, the provincial badge of Jämtland, an elk passant argent, attacked on the back by a rising falcon and in the front by a dog rampant both or; all animals armed and langued gules. The shield surmounted two muskets in saltire or". The coat of arms of the Jämtland Ranger Regiment (I 5/Fo 22) 1994–2000 and the Jämtland Group (Jämtlandsgruppen) since 2000. Blazon: "Azure, the provincial badge of Jämtland, an elk passant argent, attacked on the back by a rising falcon and in the front by a dog rampant both or; all animals armed and langued gules. The shield surmounted two swords in saltire or".

Medals
In connection with the disbandment of the regiment in 2005, the Jämtlands fältjägarremente och Östersunds garnisons minnesmedalj ("Jämtland Ranger Regiment and Östersund Garrison Commemorative") in silver (JämtfältjägregMSM) was established.

Other
The regiment's anniversary was 20 September, as a memory of the Battle of Nowodwor on 20 September 1655. The battle honour is shared with Norrland Dragoon Regiment and later with the Army Ranger Battalion.

Commanding officers
Regimental commanders active at the regiment 1687–1997 and 2000–2005. The years 1983-1990 the regiment was a part of Östersund Army Garrison (ÖAG). For the years 1998-2000, see Fältjägarbrigaden.

Commanders

1687–1705: C Hård af Segerstad
1704–1705: B Ribbing (acting)
1705–1710: B Ribbing
1710–1717: M Planting-Bergloo
1717–1725: R H Horn
1725–1739: J Svinhufvud
1739–1751: Gotthard Wilhelm Marcks von Würtenberg
1751–1760: J Hastfer
1760–1762: H Wright
1762–1763: Carl Sparre
1763–1765: C O von Segebaden
1765–1766: C C von Blixen
1766–1768: C Hierta
1769–1769: F Ehrensvärd
1769–1769: C G Strömsköld
1769–1769: CC Ekeblad
1770–1770: Gustaf Adolf von Siegroth
1770–1775: Samuel Gustaf Stierneld
1775–1776: G A Torwigge
1776–1785: Carl Adam Wachtmeister
1785–1785: L P Almfelt
1785–1791: A L Lewenhaupt
1791–1792: G Gyllengranat
1792–1802: G G Hierta
1802–1805: Johan Henrik Tawast
1805–1813: Nils Gyldenstolpe
1813–1817: Johan Fredrik Eek
1817–1818: Nils Gyldenstolpe
1818–1821: Gustaf Abraham Peyron
1821–1821: G A Koskull
1821–1824: Carl Henrik Gyllenhaal
1824–1844: J F Boy
1844–1853: G M D F Armfelt
1854–1862: C A P Ström
1862–1875: C H H Mörner
1875–1879: Axel Ryding
1879–1884: Herman von Hohenhausen
1884–1888: O G Nordenskjöld
1888–1891: Lieutenant colonel Jesper Crusebjörn
1891–1894: H F Gyllenram
1894–1897: W A G Nisbeth
1897–1904: F I von Heland
1904–1912: Axel Tauvon
1912–1917: Vilhelm Rappe
1917–1928: Colonel Gösta Lilliehöök
1928–1931: Gösta Törngren
1931–1937: Karl Beskow
1937–1942: Nils Stenbeck
1942–1949: Colonel Carl-Oscar Agell
1949–1960: Nils Erik Bouveng
1960–1961: Colonel Carl Eric Almgren
1961–1968: Karl Johan F:son Sergel
1968–1979: Sture Gustav Fornwall
1979–1983: Senior colonel Jan Erik Bertil Liedgren
1983–1984: Karl-Evert Englund
1984–1990: Jan Leif Arne Nilsson
1990–1991: Markku Samuli Sieppi
1991–1994: Christer Franzén
1994–1994: Gustaf Ingvar Gustafsson
1994–1997: Per Ove Fahlén
1998–2000: See Fältjägarbrigaden
2000–2003: Colonel Anders Brännström
2003–2005: Per-Eric Gustavsson

Deputy commanders
1979–1983: Colonel Karl-Evert Englund
1984–1985: Colonel Karl-Evert Englund

Names, designations and locations

See also
 List of Swedish infantry regiments

Footnotes

References

Notes

Print

Further reading

Östersund Garrison
Infantry corps of the Swedish Army
Military units and formations established in 1670
Military units and formations disestablished in 1983
Military units and formations established in 1990
Military units and formations disestablished in 1997
Military units and formations established in 2000
Military units and formations disestablished in 2004
Military units and formations established in 2021